Daisy Nakaziro (born 22 September 1997) is a Ugandan footballer who plays as a goalkeeper for FUFA Women Super League club Uganda Martyrs WFC and the Uganda women's national team.

Club career
Nakaziro has played for Lady Doves in Uganda.

International career
Nakaziro capped for Uganda at senior level during the 2021 COSAFA Women's Championship.

References

External links

1997 births
Living people
Ugandan women's footballers
Women's association football goalkeepers
Uganda women's international footballers